Ion Varta (born 12 December 1958, Larga, Briceni) is an academic and politician from the Republic of Moldova.

Biography
After graduating in 1982 from Moldova State University with a degree in history, he joined the faculty at Ion Creangă State Pedagogical University.

From 2005 to 2009, Varta served as member of the Parliament of Moldova. He is a member of the Commission for the Study of the Communist Dictatorship in Moldova.

External links 
 Biografie
 Preşedintele interimar al Republicii Moldova Mihai Ghimpu a emis un decret prezidenţial privind constituirea Comisiei pentru studierea şi aprecierea regimului comunist totalitar din Republica Moldova.
Moldovan authorities going to condemn communist regime…
Hundreds of thousands of cases to be examined by commission for combating Communism 
 http://www.privesc.eu/?p=1884 - The first press conference of the Commission, Moldpress, January 18, 2010. Video.
 https://web.archive.org/web/20100309165120/http://www.timpul.md/article/2010/01/18/5881 - interview with Gheorghe Cojocaru, president of the Commission.
 Vladimir Tismăneanu, Un moment istoric: Comisia de studiere a comunismului
 Website of the Parlamient of Moldova

References

1958 births
Living people
Moldova State University alumni
20th-century Moldovan historians
Moldovan MPs 2005–2009
Popular Front of Moldova politicians
Members of the Commission for the Study of the Communist Dictatorship in Moldova
Academic staff of Ion Creangă State Pedagogical University
21st-century Moldovan historians